Robinson-Tabb House is a historic home located near Martinsburg, Berkeley County, West Virginia. It is a two-and-a-half story Federal-style residence. The original section was built about 1818 of logs, with brick added between about 1840 and 1844. It has a double-gallery recessed porch on the north side and a stone outbuilding dated to about 1818. It was listed on the National Register of Historic Places in 2004.

References

Houses on the National Register of Historic Places in West Virginia
Federal architecture in West Virginia
Houses completed in 1818
Houses in Berkeley County, West Virginia
National Register of Historic Places in Martinsburg, West Virginia